Lasseter may refer to:

People 

 John Lasseter, chief creative officer at Pixar and Walt Disney Animation Studios
 Lewis Harold Bell Lasseter
 Vicki Lasseter

Other 

 Lasseter Highway
 Lasseter's Reef
 Lasseter (musical), a 1971 Australian musical by Reg Livermore, Patrick Flynn and Sandra McKenzie

See also

 Lassiter (disambiguation)
 Lassetter, a surname